Tyler Harvey may refer to:
Tyler Harvey (basketball), American basketball player
Tyler Harvey (footballer), English footballer